Solenopsis nitens is one of more than 185 species in the genus Solenopsis. It is found in Sri Lanka.

References

External links

 at antwiki.org
Animaldiversity.org
Itis.org
Research Gate

nitens
Hymenoptera of Asia
Insects described in 1903